Zahor Chocolates was a Spanish professional cycling team that was active between 1985 and 1989.

History

The team was led primarily by Miguel Moreno Cachinero, who led the team for four years. They were primarily supplied bikes by Macario, with the exception of the first season in 1985. The team's most successful race was the Vuelta a España, where they won a total of four stages. For the 1987 Giro d'Italia the team was renamed Zahor Chocolates-Tokke, when Tokke became a co-sponsor. The team was also briefly renamed to Zahor Chocolates-Pralin for the 1988 Giro d'Italia, with the acquisition of the sponsor Pralin.

Major wins

Grand Tours

Vuelta a España
4 stages (2 in 1986, 1 in 1987, 1 in 1989)

Other races

2 stages in the Vuelta a Murcia (1 stage in 1985, 1 stage in 1987)

References

Defunct cycling teams based in Spain
Cycling teams established in 1985
Cycling teams disestablished in 1989
1985 establishments in Spain
1989 disestablishments in Spain